The Benoit School District (BSD) was a public school district serving, in Bolivar County, Mississippi (USA): Benoit, Scott, and areas around those two settlements.

The sole school of the district was the Ray Brooks School (Grades PK-12), in unincorporated Bolivar County. The district headquarters was previously in a building in Benoit. Later it was in Ray Brooks itself.

On July 1, 2014, the district consolidated into the West Bolivar Consolidated School District. Ray Brooks itself continued to operate until its 2020 closure.

History

Beginning in 1986 district students at the high school level did not attend Ray Brooks (previously Nugent Center School, a.k.a. Benoit High School), but instead West Bolivar High School of the West Bolivar School District, in Rosedale. However high school classes at Ray Brooks resumed in 2000. Linda Coleman, a Democrat member of the Mississippi House of Representatives from Mound Bayou, stated that the costs of transporting children to West Bolivar from Benoit were too high.

In 2012 the Mississippi Legislature passed a bill that required five school districts in Bolivar County to consolidate into two larger ones. On July 1, 2014, the Benoit district consolidated into the West Bolivar Consolidated School District. West Bolivar closed Ray Brooks in 2020.

Demographics
The school district had 287 students as of 2012. As of that year, of the 152 school districts in the State of Mississippi, Benoit was the smallest K-12 district (meaning the smallest which had all thirteen grade levels) and one of the 20 smallest school districts overall in the state.

Accountability statistics
As of 2012, the district was, on a state seven step accountability rating, given the third lowest, "low performing," due to test scores. As of the same year the school had a 92% graduation rate, which is much higher than the Mississippi state average.

School uniforms
Students were required to wear school uniforms.

See also

List of school districts in Mississippi

References

Further reading
Legislation from the Mississippi Legislature requiring the Bolivar County school district consolidations
Ruling from the  U.S. Department of Justice about the Bolivar County school district consolidations

External links

Education in Bolivar County, Mississippi
Former school districts in Mississippi
2014 disestablishments in Mississippi
School districts disestablished in 2014